Billy Singh was a Fijian football coach who managed the national team, including for their famous victory against Australia in 1988. Singh died before November 2010. Singh was an Indo-Fijian, the son of Sashi Mahendra Singh who also managed the national team.

References

Date of birth missing
Date of death missing
Fijian football managers
Fiji national football team managers
Fijian people of Indian descent